List of football clubs in El Salvador sorted by division:

Primera División (2019/20 seasons)

Segunda División de Fútbol Salvadoreño (2019/20 seasons) 2002/03

Grupo Centro Occidente

Grupo Centro Oriente
CD Deportivo de Ahuachapan []Estadio Simeon Magaña[]

Tercera Division de Fútbol Salvadoreño (2019/20 seasons)

Centro Occidente

Group A
 Real Pajonal 
 C.D. Vendaval (San Isidro, Izalco)
 Nuevo San Sebastián 
 ADET (Atiquizaya)
 Racing Jr 
 C.D. Huracán
 C.D. Espartano (San Julián)
 Santa Rosa
 Arce Cara Sucia 
 Fuerte San Isidro

Group B
 Turín FESA F.C. (Turín)
 San Jerónimo Nejapa
 Guazapa 
 C.D. San Rafael Maracaná
 ADEP 
 ADO
 Cojutepeque 
 Talleres
 San Martín 
 Ilopaneco

Centro Oriente

Group A

 C.D. Real San Esteban
 Berlín
 Halcón Municipal 
 Sensunte Cabañas
 C.D. Atlético San Lorenzo
 C.D. El Remolino
 Luis Ángel Firpo (Thirds)
 Santiagueño
 C.D. San Sebastián
 California

Group B
 Huracán 
  Chagüite
 El Vencedor 
 La Línea
 C.D. UDET (El Tráncito) 
 C.D. Liberal
 Perlas 
 Cacahuatique
 C.D. Los Andes
 []Nejapa[]

Defunct clubs
 AD Municipal (Juayúa, Sonsonate)
 A.F.I
 C.D. Águila San Isidro
 C.D. Alacrán
 Arcense
 C.D. Atlético Chaparratique
 Atlético Juvenil
 Atlético Morazán
 Atlético Nacional
 Atlético San José
 C.D. Brazil
 C.D. Curazao
 C.D. Juventud Olímpica Metalio
 Chinameca Sporting Club
 C.D. Derbi San Vicente
 El Tercio (Usulután)
 España
 C.D. Espartano
 Espíritu Santo
  Estrellas del Sur
 C.D. Estrella Roja
 Estudiantes F.C.
 Fuerte Aguilares
 Guadalupano
 Inca Súper Flat
 Juventud Alegre (Candelaria de la Frontera, Santa Ana)
 Juventud Cara Sucia (Cara Sucia)
 Malacoff
 Mario Calvo (Izalco)
 Masahuat F.C.
 Nueva Concepción
 Olímpico Litoral
 C.D. Quezaltepeque
 Real Destroyer
 C.D. Real Zaragoza
 Salvadoreño (Armenia)
 San José Sacare
 C.D. San Miguel
 San Pedro Masahuat
 San Salvador F.C.
 C.D. Santa Bárbara
 Santa María 
 C.D Santiagueño
 TACA (Cantón Tacanahua, Ahuachapán)
 C.D. Tehuacán
 Titán
 Vista Hermosa

 
El Salvador
Football clubs
Football clubs